Samuel Bayón Garcia (born 15 March 1983) is a Spanish footballer who last played for Slovak club MFK Zemplín Michalovce mainly as a right winger.

External links 
 
 Futbolme profile  
 

1983 births
Living people
People from Vilassar de Mar
Sportspeople from the Province of Barcelona
Spanish footballers
Footballers from Catalonia
Association football wingers
Segunda División players
Segunda División B players
Tercera División players
CE L'Hospitalet players
Burgos CF footballers
Deportivo Alavés players
FC Cartagena footballers
Benidorm CF footballers
CD Badajoz players
UE Costa Brava players
Orihuela CF players
CF Badalona players
MFK Zemplín Michalovce players
Slovak Super Liga players
Spanish expatriate footballers
Spanish expatriate sportspeople in Slovakia
Expatriate footballers in Slovakia
CE Mataró players
UE Vilassar de Mar players